The Wedding is a 2000 French-Russian comedy film directed by Pavel Lungin. It was entered into the 2000 Cannes Film Festival. The film was the Aurora Award winner at the Tromsø International Film Festival in 2001.

Plot
Tanya returns to her hometown after working as a model in Moscow.  She decides to marry Mishka.  A series of unexpected events arise during the process.

Cast
 Marat Basharov as Mishka
 Mariya Mironova as Tanya
 Andrey Panin as Garkusha
 Aleksander Semchev as Borzov (as Aleksandr Semchev)
 Vladimir Simonov as Borodin
 Mariya Golubkina as Sveta
 Natalya Kolyakanova as Rimma
 Yelena Novikova as Zoika
 Oleg Esaulenko as Svetlanov
 Marina Golub as Café manager
 Vladimir Kashpur as Grandfather
 Nadezhda Markina as Valka
 Aleksei Panin
 Galina Petrova as Mother
 Pavel Polmatov as Tolya
 Ilya Rutberg as Kamussidi
 Vladimir Salnikov as Father

References

External links

2000 films
2000 comedy-drama films
French comedy-drama films
Russian comedy-drama films
2000s Russian-language films
Films directed by Pavel Lungin
Films about weddings
Films about modeling
2000s French films